Chauliognathus is a genus of soldier beetles in the family Cantharidae. Adults have almost rectangular bodies. Some are red and black, similar to the military uniforms that were common before the usage of camouflage, hence the name of soldier beetles. Others are orange and black. The elytra or first pair of wings are softer than the elytra of most beetles, that is why their other common name is leatherwings. The adults are frequently found on flowers, such as sunflowers, goldenrod, coneflowers, where they mate and feed on pollen and nectar. The larvae are more common in the ground or among debris, where they feed on eggs or larvae of other insects. The adults are most frequently found in summer and early fall.
They are native to America and Australia.

Species
Chauliognathus arizonensis Fender, 1964
Chauliognathus basalis LeConte, 1859 – Colorado soldier beetle
Chauliognathus deceptus Fender, 1964
Chauliognathus discus LeConte, 1853
Chauliognathus expansus
Chauliognathus fallax
Chauliognathus fasciatus LeConte, 1881
Chauliognathus flavipes
Chauliognathus ineptus Horn, 1885
Chauliognathus lecontei Champion, 1914
Chauliognathus lewisi Crotch, 1874
Chauliognathus limbicollis LeConte, 1858
Chauliognathus lineatus
Chauliognathus lugubris Fabricius, 1801 – plague soldier beetle or green soldier beetle 
Chauliognathus marginatus (Fabricius, 1775) – margined leatherwing
Chauliognathus misellus Horn, 1885
Chauliognathus morios
Chauliognathus obscurus Schaeffer, 1909
Chauliognathus octamaculatus
Chauliognathus omissus Fall, 1930
Chauliognathus opacus LeConte 1866
Chauliognathus pensylvanicus (De Geer, 1774) – goldenrod soldier beetle or Pennsylvania leatherwing
Chauliognathus profundus LeConte, 1858
Chauliognathus opacus LeConte, 1866
Chauliognathus riograndensis
Chauliognathus scutellaris LeConte, 1858
Chauliognathus tetrapunctatus
Chauliognathus transversus Fender, 1964
Chauliognathus tricolor Castelnau, 1840
Chauliognathus werneri Fender, 1964

References

External links
Chauliognathus, BugGuide

Cantharidae
Elateroidea genera